KELE is a radio station airing a newstalk format licensed to Mountain Grove, Missouri, broadcasting on 1360 kHz AM.  The station is owned by Fred Dockins, through licensee Dockins Communications, Inc. KELE-AM is branded as "The Patriot."

KELE is an affiliate of Westwood One and CBS Radio News along with Radio America. The weekday program lineup includes America In The Morning, First Light, Doug Stephan's Good Day, The Jonathon Brandmeier Show, The Dana Show, Dave Ramsey, The Chad Benson Show and The Jim Bohannon Show.

KELE also carries local news at the bottom of the hour 24hrs a day along with local weather and feature programming.

References

External links
 

News and talk radio stations in the United States
ELE (AM)
Radio stations established in 1954
1954 establishments in Missouri